Güllübahçe is a small town in the District of Söke, Aydın Province, Turkey. As of 2010 it had a population of 1831 people.

References

Villages in Söke District